Quercus miquihuanensis is a species of oak in the family Fagaceae. It is endemic to the Nuevo León and Tamaulipas states of Mexico. It is an endangered species, threatened by habitat loss. It is placed in section Lobatae.

See also

References

miquihuanensis
Endemic oaks of Mexico
Flora of Nuevo León
Flora of Tamaulipas
Trees of Northeastern Mexico
Endangered biota of Mexico
Endangered flora of North America
Taxonomy articles created by Polbot
Flora of the Sierra Madre Oriental